Yegor Vladimirovich Shevchenko (born 4 February 1978) is a former Russian professional footballer.

Club career
He made his debut in the Russian Premier League in 2002 for FC Shinnik Yaroslavl.

References

1978 births
Footballers from Saint Petersburg
Living people
Russian footballers
Association football midfielders
FC Shinnik Yaroslavl players
Russian Premier League players
FC Mordovia Saransk players
FC Dynamo Saint Petersburg players
FC Petrotrest players